{{DISPLAYTITLE:C15H16O9}}
The molecular formula C15H16O9 (molar mass: 340.28 g/mol, exact mass: 340.0794 u) may refer to:

 Aesculin (esculin), a coumarin
 Daphnin, a coumarin

Molecular formulas